Brahim Akhiat (c. 1941 – 7 February 2018) was a Moroccan author and poet, and a Berber activist.

Early life
Brahim Akhiat was born in 1941 in Akhiaten, Morocco.

Career
Akhiat began his career as a mathematics teacher in Kenitra and Rabat. Meanwhile, he became an Amazigh, or Berber, activist. In Rabat in 1967 he co-founded the Association marocaine de recherches et d'échanges culturelles, an Amazigh cultural organization which rose to prominence, alongside Abdellah Bounfour, Ahmed Akouaou, Omar El Khalfaoui and Ali El Jaoui. He served as its secretary general until his death. He joined the board of the Royal Institute of the Amazigh Culture in 2002.

Akhiat was the author of four books. He wrote both prose and poetry in Arabic and in French. His main theme was the relationship between Berber culture and Moroccan national identity. He was also the editor-in-chief of Amud and Tamunt. A conference was held in his honor near Kenitra in 2009.

Death
Akhiat died on 7 February 2018.

Selected works

References

1940s births
2018 deaths
People from Souss-Massa
20th-century Moroccan writers
21st-century Moroccan writers
Berber activists
Berber writers
Berber poets
Moroccan male writers
20th-century Moroccan poets
Shilha people
21st-century Moroccan poets